Wild ginger may refer to any of a variety of plants, often with a similar appearance, odour or taste to cultivated ginger. Species involved include: 

Any of the Alpinia species, especially A. caerulea, a large tropical flowering plant
Any of the Asarum species, especially A. caudatum, a groundcover with kidney- or heart-shaped leaves and a small maroon flower and ginger-scented roots
Curcuma australasica, "Australian turmeric" 
Hedychium gardnerianum, Himalayan plant with fragrant yellow spiked flowers
Siphonochilus aethiopicus, "African ginger," a rhizome with a showy purple flower with a yellow center
Any of the numerous Zingiber species